The Magic Band was the backing band of American singer, songwriter and multi-instrumentalist Captain Beefheart between 1967 and 1982. The rotating lineup featured dozens of performers, many of whom became known by nicknames given to them by Beefheart. Ex-members of the Magic Band formed the short-lived group Mallard in 1974. The Magic Band reformed in 2003, without Beefheart.

Origins
The members of the original Magic Band had come together in 1964. At this time Don Van Vliet (later dubbed Captain Beefheart) was simply the lead singer of the group, which had been brought together by guitarist and former classmate Alex St. Clair. As in many emerging groups in California at the time, there were elements of psychedelia and the foundations of contemporary hippie counterculture. In this early incarnation they were a blues-rock outfit.

The group was therefore promoted as "Captain Beefheart and his Magic Band", on the premise that Captain Beefheart had "magic powers" and, upon drinking a Pepsi, could summon up "His Magic Band" to appear and perform behind him. The strands of this logic emanated from Vliet's Beefheart persona having been "written in" as a character in a "teenage operetta" that friend Frank Zappa had formulated, along with Van Vliet's renowned "Pepsi moods" with his mother Willie Sue and his generally spoilt teenage demeanor. The name "His Magic Band" changed to "the Magic Band" in 1972.

The group played numerous car-club dances and juke joint gigs, and won the Teenage Fair Battle of the Bands. (The Teenage Fair was an annual event held at the Hollywood Palladium in the 1960s. It was sponsored by radio stations and had rides and various merchandise booths with music- and youth-related items. Bands performed.) In late 1965, the group finally bagged a contract for recording two singles with the newly created A&M Records label with Leonard Grant as their manager. It was at this time that musical relationships had also been struck with members of Rising Sons who would later feature in the band's recordings. The A&M deal also brought some contention between members of the band, torn between a career as an experimental "pop" group and that of a purist blues band. Working with young producer David Gates also opened up horizons for Vliet's skills as a poet-cum-lyricist, with his "Who Do You Think You're Fooling" on the flipside of the band's first single, a cover of the Ellas McDaniel/Willie Dixon-penned hit, "Diddy Wah Diddy". Fate and circumstance, not for the first time, would befall the band's success upon its release – which coincided with a singles cover of the same song by the Remains. The initial line-up of the Magic Band that entered the studio for the A&M recordings was not that which emerged by the second release, "Moonchild", also backed by a Vliet-penned number, "Frying Pan". A 12" vinyl 45rpm mono EP/mono mini-cassette tape was later released in 1987, with the four tracks of the two singles, plus "Here I Am, I Always Am" as a fifth previously unreleased song. This release was titled The Legendary A&M Sessions, with a red-marbled cover and (later) members Moon, Blakely, Vliet, Snouffer and Handley seated in a "temperance dance band" photo-pose.

The original Magic Band was primarily a rhythm and blues band, led by local Lancaster guitarist Alexis Snouffer, along with Doug Moon (guitar), Jerry Handley (bass), and Vic Mortenson (drums), the last being rotated with and finally replaced by Paul "P.G." Blakely. For the first A&M recording Mortenson had been called up for active service and Snouffer stood in on drums, with a recently recruited Richard Hepner taking up the guitar role. By the time the single was aired on a pop television show P. G. Blakely was back in the drum seat. He then left for a career in television and was replaced by John French by the time the band cut their first album, as the first release on the new Buddah Records label.

Personnel in the Magic Band for Beefheart's first album, Safe as Milk, were Alex St. Clair, Jerry Handley and John French. Earlier meetings with the Rising Sons had also secured them the guitar and arranging skills of Ry Cooder, which also brought about input from Taj Mahal on percussion and guitar work from Cooder's brother-in-law Russ Titelman. Further guests to this line-up included Milt Holland on percussion and the all-important and controversial theremin work on Electricity by Samuel Hoffman. It was perhaps this track, above the others, which caused A&M to view the band as "unsuitable" for their label with what was seen as weird and too psychedelic for popular consumption. Thus, this album was recorded for Buddah, with the band signed to Kama Sutra, which left them close to penniless after extricating themselves from A&M. A large proportion of the tracks on this album were co-written with Van Vliet by Herb Bermann, whom Vliet initially met up with at a bar gig near Lancaster. Part-time Hollywood television actor and budding scriptwriter Bermann and his then wife Cathleen spent some time in Vliet's company prior to this release. Bermann would later write for Neil Young and script an early Spielberg-directed television medical drama. Gary "Magic" Marker (the "Magic" added by Beefheart) was involved in early session work for this release, and his involvement with Rising Sons was also instrumental in acquiring the skills of Cooder, upon an unfulfilled suggestion that Marker might produce the album. Marker would later lay down two uncredited bass tracks for Trout Mask Replica before being replaced by Mark Boston.

French worked on five more Beefheart albums, while Snouffer worked with Beefheart on and off on three more albums. Bill Harkleroad joined the Magic Band as guitarist for Trout Mask Replica and stayed with Beefheart through May 1974.

Beefheart takes the lead
While appearing humorous and kind-hearted in public, by all accounts Van Vliet was a severe taskmaster who abused his musicians verbally and sometimes physically. Vliet once told drummer John French he had been diagnosed as a paranoid schizophrenic and thus he would see inexistent conspiracies that explained this behaviour. The band were reportedly paid little or nothing. French recalled that the musicians' contract with Van Vliet's company stipulated that Van Vliet and the managers were paid from gross proceeds before expenses, then expenses were paid, then the band members evenly split any remaining funds—in effect making band members liable for all expenses. As a result, French was paid nothing at all for a 33-city US tour in 1971 and a total of $78 for a tour of Europe and the US in late 1975. In his 2010 memoir Beefheart: Through The Eyes of Magic French recounted being "...screamed at, beaten up, drugged, ridiculed, humiliated, arrested, starved, stolen from, and thrown down a half-flight of stairs by his employer".

The musicians also resented Van Vliet for taking complete credit for composition and arranging when the musicians themselves pieced together most of the songs from taped fragments or impressionistic directions such as "Play it like a bat being dragged out of oil and it's trying to survive, but it's dying from asphyxiation." John French summarized the disagreement over composing and arranging credits metaphorically:

The Magic Band - Reformed
Receiving only a "grumpy" reception from Van Vliet, the Magic Band reformed in 2003 with John French on drums, lead vocals and harmonica, Gary Lucas and Denny Walley on guitars, Rockette Morton on bass, and Robert Williams on drums for the vocal numbers. The initial impetus came from Matt Groening who wanted them to play at the All Tomorrows Parties festival he was curating. For their subsequent European tour, Williams left and was replaced by Michael Traylor.

John Peel was initially skeptical about the re-formed Magic Band. However, after he aired a live recording of the band playing at the 2003 All Tomorrow's Parties festival on his radio show, he was lost for words and had to put on another record to regain his composure. In 2004 the band did a live session for him at his home "Peel Acres". They played over 30 shows throughout the United Kingdom and Europe, and one in the United States. They also released two albums: Back to the Front (on the London-based ATP Recordings, 2003) and 21st Century Mirror Men (2005).

The group disbanded in 2006 but reformed in 2011, with Lucas and Traylor replaced by Eric Klerks and Craig Bunch respectively, to play at ATP once again (which was due to take place in November, curated by Jeff Mangum). The festival was postponed until the following March but they honoured the other UK and Ireland dates which had been booked to coincide with it, the new line-up being dubbed "The Best Batch Yet" by Beefheart song-title-referencing commentators. They returned to play the rescheduled ATP and more UK gigs in March 2012, followed by a European tour in September and October. They toured Europe again in 2013 and 2014.

The reformed band's repertoire was initially drawn mainly from the Clear Spot and Trout Mask Replica albums, with some of the latter's songs performed as instrumentals, allowing the intricacy of the instrumental parts to be heard, where they had previously been obscured by Beefheart's vocals or sax. During subsequent tours the setlist has been expanded to include a more representative selection of Beefheart's repertoire. French has described the set as "a play which should be rolled out from time to time".

Discography

Members

Original run

Classic era
 Alex St. Clair- guitar, drums, musical director 
 John French (Alias:Drumbo)- drums, vocals, guitar, musical director 
 Jeff Cotton (Alias:Antennae Jimmy Semens)- guitar, slide guitar, vocals 
 Bill Harkleroad (Alias:Zoot Horn Rollo)- guitar, slide guitar, musical director 
 Mark Boston (Alias:Rockette Morton)- bass, guitar 
 Victor Hayden (Alias:The Mascara Snake)- bass clarinet 
 Jeff Burchell- drums (1969)
 Art Tripp (Alias:Ed Marimba)- drums, marimba, percussion, piano, harpsichord

Others
 Jerry Handley- bass 
 Doug Moon- guitar 
 Paul G. Blakely- drums 
 Vic Mortenson- drums 
 Richard Hepner- guitar 
 Ry Cooder- guitar, slide guitar 
 Gerry McGee- guitar, slide guitar 
 Gary "Magic" Marker- bass 
 Elliot Ingber (Alias:Winged Eel Fingerling)- guitar 
 Roy Estrada (Alias:Oréjon)- bass 
 Bruce Fowler (Alias:Fossil)- trombone, air bass 
 Greg Davidson (Alias:Ella Guru)- guitar, slide guitar 
 Jimmy Carl Black (Alias:Indian Ink)- drums, percussion 
 Denny Walley (Alias:Feelers Rebo)- guitar, slide guitar, accordion 
 Jeff Moris Tepper (Alias:White Jew)- guitar, slide guitar 
 John Thomas- keyboards 
 Eric Drew Feldman (Alias:Black Jew Kittaboo)- bass, keyboards 
 Gary Jaye- drums 
 Robert Williams (Alias:Wait For Me)- drums, percussion 
 Richard Redus (Alias:Mercury Josef)- guitar, slide guitar 
 Richard Snyder (Alias:Brave Midnight Hat Size)- guitar, slide guitar, bass, marimba, viola 
 Gary Lucas- guitar, slide guitar 
 Cliff Martinez- drums, percussion, glass washboard

Reunion era

Current
 John French- drums, vocals, saxophone, guitar, harmonica 
 Mark Boston- bass, guitar 
 Eric Klerks- guitar, bass, iPad 
 Andrew Niven- drums 
 Max Kutner- guitar 
 Jonathan Sindleman- keyboards

Past
 Denny Walley- guitar, slide guitar, accordion 
 Robert Williams- drums, percussion 
 Gary Lucas-guitar, slide guitar 
 Michael Traylor- drums 
 Craig Bunch- drums 
 Brian Havey- keyboards

Timeline

References 

Musical groups established in 1964
Musical groups disestablished in 1981
Musical groups reestablished in 2003
Musical groups disestablished in 2017
American art rock groups
American blues rock musical groups
Protopunk groups
American blues musical groups
American jazz ensembles from California
American rhythm and blues musical groups
Psychedelic musical groups
Garage rock groups from California
Surrealist groups
1964 establishments in California
2017 disestablishments in California
ATP Recordings artists
Proper Records artists
Virgin Records artists
Dandelion Records artists
Let Them Eat Vinyl artists